Canna Creek is a stream in the U.S. state of Mississippi. It is a tributary to Lobutcha Creek.

Canna is a name derived from the Choctaw language purported to mean "water course". A variant name is "Carey Lake".

References

Rivers of Mississippi
Rivers of Attala County, Mississippi
Mississippi placenames of Native American origin